Chalcopyrite is a copper iron sulfide mineral and the most abundant copper ore mineral. It has the chemical formula CuFeS2 and crystallizes in the tetragonal system. It has a brassy to golden yellow color and a hardness of 3.5 to 4 on the Mohs scale. Its streak is diagnostic as green-tinged black.

On exposure to air, chalcopyrite tarnishes to a variety of oxides, hydroxides, and sulfates. Associated copper minerals include the sulfides bornite (Cu5FeS4), chalcocite (Cu2S), covellite (CuS), digenite (Cu9S5); carbonates such as malachite and azurite, and rarely oxides such as cuprite (Cu2O). It is rarely found in association with native copper. Chalcopyrite is a conductor of electricity.

Copper can be extracted from chalcopyrite ore using various methods. The two predominant methods are pyrometallurgy and hydrometallurgy, the former being the most commercially viable.

Etymology 
The name chalcopyrite comes from the Greek words , which means copper, and ', which means striking fire. It was sometimes historically referred to as "yellow copper".

Identification 
Chalcopyrite is often confused with pyrite and gold since all three of these minerals have a yellowish color and a metallic luster. Some important mineral characteristics that help distinguish these minerals are hardness and streak. Chalcopyrite is much softer than pyrite and can be scratched with a knife, whereas pyrite cannot be scratched by a knife. However, chalcopyrite is harder than gold, which, if pure, can be scratched by copper. Chalcopyrite has a distinctive black streak with green flecks in it. Pyrite has a black streak and gold has a yellow streak.

Chemistry 

Natural chalcopyrite has no solid solution series with any other sulfide minerals. There is limited substitution of zinc with copper despite chalcopyrite having the same crystal structure as sphalerite.

Minor amounts of elements such as silver, gold, cadmium, cobalt, nickel, lead, tin, and zinc can be measured (at parts per million levels), likely substituting for copper and iron.  Selenium, bismuth, tellurium, and arsenic may substitute for sulfur in minor amounts. Chalcopyrite can be oxidized to form malachite, azurite, and cuprite.

Paragenesis 

Chalcopyrite is present with many ore-bearing environments via a variety of ore forming processes.

Chalcopyrite is present in volcanogenic massive sulfide ore deposits and sedimentary exhalative deposits, formed by deposition of copper during hydrothermal circulation. Chalcopyrite is concentrated in this environment via fluid transport. Porphyry copper ore deposits are formed by concentration of copper within a granitic stock during the ascent and crystallisation of a magma. Chalcopyrite in this environment is produced by concentration within a magmatic system.

Chalcopyrite is an accessory mineral in Kambalda type komatiitic nickel ore deposits, formed from an immiscible sulfide liquid in sulfide-saturated ultramafic lavas. In this environment chalcopyrite is formed by a sulfide liquid stripping copper from an immiscible silicate liquid.

Chalcopyrite has been the most important ore of copper since the Bronze Age.

Occurrence 

Even though Chalcopyrite does not contain the most copper in its structure relative to other minerals, it is the most important copper ore since it can be found in many localities. Chalcopyrite ore occurs in a variety of ore types, from huge masses as at Timmins, Ontario, to irregular veins and disseminations associated with granitic to dioritic intrusives as in the porphyry copper deposits of Broken Hill, the American cordillera and the Andes. The largest deposit of nearly pure chalcopyrite ever discovered in Canada was at the southern end of the Temagami Greenstone Belt where Copperfields Mine extracted the high-grade copper.

Chalcopyrite is present in the supergiant Olympic Dam Cu-Au-U deposit in South Australia.

Chalcopyrite may also be found in coal seams associated with pyrite nodules, and as disseminations in carbonate sedimentary rocks.

Structure 

Chalcopyrite is a member of the tetragonal crystal system. Crystallographically the structure of chalcopyrite is closely related to that of zinc blende ZnS (sphalerite). The unit cell is twice as large, reflecting an alternation of Cu+ and Fe3+ ions replacing Zn2+ ions in adjacent cells. In contrast to the pyrite structure chalcopyrite has single S2− sulfide anions rather than disulfide pairs. Another difference is that the iron cation is not diamagnetic low spin Fe(II) as in pyrite.

In the crystal structure, each metal ion is tetrahedrally coordinated to 4 sulfur anions. Each sulfur anion is bonded to two copper atoms and two iron atoms.

Extraction of copper 

Copper metal is predominantly extracted from chalcopyrite ore using two methods: pyrometallurgy and hydrometallurgy. The most common and commercially viable method, pyrometallurgy, involves "crushing, grinding, flotation, smelting, refining, and electro-refining" techniques. Crushing, leaching, solvent extraction, and electrowinning are techniques used in hydrometallurgy. Specifically in the case of chalcopyrite, pressure oxidation leaching is practiced.

Hydrometallurgical Processes 
Chalcopyrite is an exception to most copper bearing minerals. In contrast to the majority of copper minerals which can be leached at atmospheric conditions, such as through heap leaching, chalcopyrite is a refractory mineral that requires elevated temperatures as well as oxidizing conditions to release its copper into solution.  This is because of the extracting challenges which arise from the 1:1 presence of iron to copper, resulting in slow leaching kinetics. Elevated temperatures and pressures create an abundance of oxygen in solution, which facilitates faster reaction speeds in terms of breaking down chalcopyrite's crystal lattice. A hydrometallurgical process which elevates temperature with oxidizing conditions required for chalcopyrite is known as pressure oxidation leaching. A typical reaction series of chalcopyrite under oxidizing, high temperature conditions is as follows:

i) 2CuFeS2 + 4Fe2(SO4)3 -> 2Cu2++ 2SO42- + 10FeSO4+4S

ii) 4FeSO4 + O2 + 2H2SO4 -> 2Fe2(SO4)3 +2H2O

iii) 2S + 3O2 +2H2O -> 2H2SO4

(overall) 4CuFeS2+ 17O2 + 4H2O -> 4Cu2++ 2Fe2O3 + 4H2SO4

Pressure oxidation leaching is particularly useful for low grade chalcopyrite. This is because it can "process concentrate product from flotation" rather than having to process whole ore. Additionally, it can be used as an alternative method to pyrometallurgy for variable ore. Other advantages hydrometallurgical processes have in regards to copper extraction over pyrometallurgical processes (smelting) include:

 The highly variable cost of smelting
 Depending on the location, the amount of smelting availability is limited
 High cost of installing smelting infrastructure
 Ability to treat high-impurity concentrates
 Increase of recovery due to ability of treating lower-grade deposits on site
 Lower transport costs (shipping concentrate not necessary)
 Overall lower cost of copper production 

Although hydrometallurgy has its advantages, it continues to face challenges in the commercial setting. In turn, smelting continues to remain the most commercially viable method of copper extraction.

See also
 Classification of minerals
 List of minerals
 Kesterite

References

Copper ores
Sulfide minerals
Iron minerals
Tetragonal minerals
Minerals in space group 122